Defending champion Rafael Nadal defeated Novak Djokovic in the final, 6–0, 4–6, 6–1 to win the men's singles tennis title at the 2019 Italian Open. It was his record-extending ninth Italian Open title and record 34th ATP Masters 1000 title.

Nick Kyrgios was defaulted from his second round match after multiple penalties for unsportsmanlike conduct. As a result, Kyrgios forfeited all points and prize money earned from the event.

Seeds
The top eight seeds receive a bye into the second round.

Draw

Finals

Top half

Section 1

Section 2

Bottom half

Section 3

Section 4

Qualifying

Seeds

Qualifiers

Qualifying draw

First qualifier

Second qualifier

Third qualifier

Fourth qualifier

Fifth qualifier

Sixth qualifier

Seventh qualifier

References

External links
Main Draw
Qualifying Draw

Men's Singles
Italian Open - Men's Singles